Lech Trzeciakowski (24 December 1931 – 7 January 2017) was a Polish historian who served as director of the Western Institute (Instytut Zachodni) in Poznań from 1974 to 1978. Born in Poznań, he also died there in 2017.

Selected publications
Lech Trzeciakowski, Kulturkampf w zaborze pruskim, Poznań 1970
Lech Trzeciakowski, Pod pruskim zaborem 1850-1914, Warszawa 1973
Lech Trzeciakowski, Walka o polskość miast Poznańskiego na przełomie XIX i XX wieku, Poznań 1964
Lech Trzeciakowski, W dziewiętnastowiecznym Poznaniu, Poznań 1987

Notes

References
Nauka Polska
Herder Instytut, Bibliography

1931 births
2017 deaths
20th-century Polish historians
Polish male non-fiction writers
Writers from Poznań
People from Poznań Voivodeship (1921–1939)
Herder Prize recipients